The Fould family is a family of French Jewish descent known for success in banking. It was founded by Beer Léon Fould, a wine-dealer's son from Lorraine, who moved to Paris in 1784 to establish a banking business. The name comes from the Hessian city of Fulda.

Family tree

Jacob Fould (1736–1830), wine dealer
 Beer Léon Fould (1767–1855), banker, married to Charlotte Brulhen (1766–1818)
 Rose Fould Furtado (1791-1870), married to Élie Furtado, the son of the rabbi of Bayonne and the nephew of Abraham Furtado
  Cécile Charlotte Furtado-Heine (1821-1896), philanthropist and wife of Frankfurt banker Charles Heine
 Benoît Fould (1792–1858), banker and art collector, married to Helena Oppenheim, daughter of Salomon Oppenheim (1772–1828), banker
 Louis Fould (1794–1858), banker, married to Adèle Brull (1809–1839)
  Édouard Fould (1834–1881), politician, mayor of Lurcy-Lévis
 Achille Fould (1800–1867), banker and French minister of finance
 Adolphe-Ernest Fould (1824–1875), banker and politician
  (1890–1969), politician
  (1925–1986), politician
Régine Achille-Fould (1948–), film director
  Gustave-Eugène Fould (1836–1884), banker and politician, married to Valérie Simonin (1831–1919), actress, novelist and sculptor ; she later marries Prince George Ştirbey of Wallachia (1828-1925) who adopts her daughters by Fould : 
 Consuelo Fould (1862–1927), painter
  Georges Achille-Fould (1868–1951), painter
  Abraham Fould (1774–1842)
  Emile Fould (1803–1880), notary
 Paul Fould (1837–1917), married to Eve Mathilde de Günzburg (1844–1894), daughter of Joseph Günzburg (1812–1878), banker
 Juliette Fould (1839–1912), married to Eugène Péreire (1831–1908), financier
 Alice Pereire (1858–1931), married to Salomon Halfon (1854–1923, son of Michael Halfon and Rebecca de Camondo), banker
 Marie Pereire (1860–1936), married to Jules Halphen (1856–1928), son of Eugène Halphen
 Henri Isaac Halphen (1886–1962), married to Violet Crosbie (1890–?)
 Noémie Halphen (1888–1968), married to Maurice de Rothschild (1881–1957)
 Alphonse Fould (1850–1913), married to Ernestine DuPont
 Hélène Fould (1878–1927), married to Paul Helbronner (1871–1938), topographer
 Eugène Fould (1806–?)
 Henri Jules Fould (1837–1895), married to Suzette Stern (1845–)
See Stern family
 Léon Fould (1839–1924), married to Thérèse Ephrussi (1851–1911), sister of Maurice Ephrussi (1849–1916), banker
  Eugène Fould-Springer (1876–1929), married to Marie-Cecile Springer, daughter of Baron Gustav Springer, industrial magnate
 Hélène Fould-Springer (1907–1997), married to Eduardo Propper de Callejón (1895–1972), Spanish diplomat
  Elena Propper de Callejón (1943–), married to Raymond Bonham Carter (1929–2004), British banker
 Edward Henry Bonham Carter (1960—), financier
  Helena Bonham Carter (1966–), actress
 Therese Fould-Springer (1914—1953), married to Alan Payan Pryce-Jones (1908—2000), British author and politician
  David Pryce-Jones (1936–), author
  Liliane Fould-Springer (1916–2003), married to Élie de Rothschild (1917–2007), banker and vineyard owner

References

External links
Généalogies Fould 

 
French bankers
History of banking
Banking families
Jewish families